ParkZone was a brand of an intermediate-level, radio-controlled electric model aircraft, produced and distributed by an American hobby manufacturer Horizon Hobby of Champaign, Illinois, United States.  The name is taken from the term park flyer, which denotes a relatively small and unobtrusive model that can be flown in a park.

Models that represent the Parkzone lineup included various scale aircraft, such as the P-51D Mustang, F4F Wildcat, F4U Corsair and Spitfire, as well as several non-scale sport aircraft. Many of these use electronics that may be used in other park flyers and use lithium polymer batteries.

US-based hobby retail chain HobbyTown USA of Lincoln, Nebraska named ParkZone as its "2005 Hobby Company of the Year."

Parkzone offered a purchasing option called "Bind N' Fly" or "BNF", which included everything needed to fly the aircraft, except the radio transmitter. This allowed those who already own Spektrum brand transmitters to link or "bind" their transmitter to the aircraft and fly without needing to purchase an additional transmitter or receiver crystal.

On September 1, 2009, a ParkZone Sukhoi Su-26m ultra-micro indoor/outdoor model flown by an unknown pilot delayed the top of the sixth inning of a baseball game between the Los Angeles Dodgers and Arizona Diamondbacks at Dodger Stadium.  The plane eventually crashed near the Diamondbacks' dugout; Diamondbacks utility infielder Augie Ojeda picked up the model and destroyed it so that play could resume.

The model lineup included the Sukhoi SU-29MM, Sport Cub, Artizan, Fw-190 A-8, T-28 Trojan, Radian, and Radian Pro. In addition, there was an Ultra-Microline consisting of an ultra micro Icon A-5, P-5D Mustang, T-28 Trojan, Night Vapor and the Ember 2.  Several of these models have highly detailed scale features, removable landing gear, three or four-channel operation and various aftermarket add-ons and upgrades.

Previously discontinued aircraft included the Typhoon 3D sport plane, Super Decathlon, Bf-109, Fw-190, Cessna 210, Citabria, Etomic Vapor slow flyer and Slo-V slow flyer.

References

External links
 Official ParkZone website
 Official Parent Company Website
 Official Hobbyzone website
 REVOLECTRIX international website

Radio-controlled aircraft